The University Child Development Center (UCDC) at the University of Pittsburgh is a child care and early childhood education center located on Clyde Street in Shadyside just east of the main Oakland campus approximately one half mile from the center of campus at the Cathedral of Learning and adjacent to the rear property of the University's Chancellor's Residence on the Oakland-Shadyside border in Pittsburgh, Pennsylvania.

The University acquired the building, the former First Church of Christ, Scientist, in the fall of 1992 for $1.015 million.  In 1994, Pitt proceeded with a $2 million renovation of the building to accommodate the UCDC which opened its doors in the facility on May 30, 1995 after having previously been located in Bellefield Hall.

The neo-classical-style building was designed by Solon Spencer Beman and built between 1904 and 1905. In 1977 it had been designated a local historic landmark by the Pittsburgh History and Landmarks Foundation,

The University Child Development Center serves as a near-site child care and early childhood education center for children ranging in age from six weeks through six years who belong to the faculty, staff, and students of the University of Pittsburgh. The UCDC also provides laboratory, research, and practicum experiences in observing and participating with young children in classroom-based settings, for Pitt students, and students from other institutions of higher learning. The UCDC also provides resources and technical assistance in implementing appropriate programs and practices that serve young children in Pittsburgh and other communities.

The UCDC facility houses classrooms including four infant rooms, four toddler rooms, two three-year-old preschool rooms, and two four to six-year-old preschool rooms. Each room is designed to be age-appropriate for the group occupying the space. The UCDC also includes two large motor rooms (one for infants and toddlers and the other for preschool children) and an outdoor playground facility.

Gallery

References

External links
University Child Development Center homepage

Child-related organizations in the United States
Early childhood educational organizations
Neoclassical architecture in Pennsylvania
Pittsburgh History & Landmarks Foundation Historic Landmarks
Solon Spencer Beman buildings
University of Pittsburgh buildings